Pau Cendrós López (born 1 April 1987) is a Spanish footballer who plays for UD Collerense as either a right-back or a central defender.

Club career

Mallorca
Born in Palma de Mallorca, Cendrós rose through the youth ranks of Balearic Islands giants RCD Mallorca. His first professional spell was on loan, with lowly Benidorm CF.

Cendrós was loaned again in the 2008–09 season, now to Canary Islands-based club CD Tenerife, appearing rarely as it returned to La Liga after a seven-year absence. In the following year more of the same, also in the Segunda División, as he represented Levante UD.

On 29 August 2010, after being one of Levante's most important defensive players as the Valencia team returned to the top flight after two years, Cendrós finally made his debut for Mallorca's main squad at the age of 23, playing the entire 0–0 home draw against Real Madrid in the season's opener. He appeared in 31 games in his first year, starting in 29.

In the 2011–12 campaign, challenged by newly signed Chico and Gianni Zuiverloon, Cendrós still managed to be the most used player in his position, playing 25 league matches as Mallorca, coached by Joaquín Caparrós, finished in eighth position.

Gent and Alcorcón
Cendrós moved abroad for the first time on 7 August 2012, joining Belgian Pro League side K.A.A. Gent on a two-year contract. In January 2014 he returned to his country, signing with AD Alcorcón of division two.

Mallorca return and Lugo
In the summer of 2014, Cendrós re-joined first professional club Mallorca, agreeing to a two-year deal. He totalled nearly 3,000 minutes of action in the first season in his second spell, but was later deemed surplus to requirements by new manager Albert Ferrer.

Cendrós joined CD Lugo also in the second tier on 17 August 2015.

Mirandés
On 19 July 2016, Cendrós signed for fellow league team CD Mirandés as a free agent. On 25 January 2017, after only three competitive appearances, he left by mutual consent.

Later career
Cendrós competed in the Spanish lower leagues until his retirement, representing in quick succession SCR Peña Deportiva, Unionistas de Salamanca CF, CE Andratx and UD Poblense. He also had a spell in the Andorran Primera Divisió with UE Sant Julià.

References

External links

1987 births
Living people
Spanish footballers
Footballers from Palma de Mallorca
Association football defenders
La Liga players
Segunda División players
Segunda División B players
Tercera División players
Tercera Federación players
RCD Mallorca B players
RCD Mallorca players
Benidorm CF footballers
CD Tenerife players
Levante UD footballers
AD Alcorcón footballers
CD Lugo players
CD Mirandés footballers
Unionistas de Salamanca CF players
UD Poblense players
Belgian Pro League players
K.A.A. Gent players
UE Sant Julià players
Spanish expatriate footballers
Expatriate footballers in Belgium
Expatriate footballers in Andorra
Spanish expatriate sportspeople in Belgium
Spanish expatriate sportspeople in Andorra